iReTron is a recommerce and recycling service company in Los Gatos, California. It allows consumers to sell their old electronics, including cellphones, iPhones, iPods, mp3 players, tablets, iPads, e-readers, calculators and other devices, for free.

The website has users submit the model and condition of their used devices, then get a cash offer that the user can either accept or decline. iReTron also repairs and resells used electronics, and offers free shipping.

In 2014, the company appeared on the TV show Shark Tank.

See also
Electronic waste in the United States

References

External links
iReTron

Electronic waste in the United States
Software companies based in California
Mobile phone recycling
Waste management companies of the United States
Los Gatos, California
Companies based in Santa Clara County, California
Defunct software companies of the United States